Remziye Bakır (born 22 February 1997) is a Turkish women's football midfielder, who plays for the Turkish Women's Super  League club Çaykur Rizespor with jersey number 14. She was a member of the Turkey women's U-19 team

Early life
Remziye Bakır was born in Siverek town of Şanlıurfa Province, southeastern Turkey on 22 February 1997.

Club career

Bakır obtained her license from Gazi Üniversitesispor in Ankara on 15 June 2010. She started playing for her team in the 2011-12 Turkish Women's First Football League debuting in the match on 26 March 2012. After scoring three goals in ten games, she transferred the next season to Fomget Gençlik ve Spor in the same city. Her club saw relegation to the Turkish Women's Second Football League at the end of the 2012-13 season. She played three more seasons in the Second League with Fomget GS, capped 47 times and scored 18 goals in total. In the 2016–17 season, Bakır joined the Diyarbakır-based club Amed S.K. in the Second League. At the end of the league season, she enjoyed her team's promotion to the First League. She played in 23 matches in two seasons and scored six goals for Amed S.K. In the second half of the 2017-18 First League season, she left her club, and moved to ALG Spor in Gaziantep to play in the Second League. Her team was promoted to the Fşrst League at the end of the season. Her team became runners-up of the 2018–19 season after losing the play-off match to Beşiktaş J.K. In yje 2019-20 Women's First League season, she returned to her former club AMed S.K.

Bakır moved to her former club Fomget G.S. in the 2020–21 First League season.

For the 2021-22 Turkcell Women's Super League season, she transferred to the newly formed team >Çaykur Rizespor.

International career
Bakır was admitted to the Turkey women's national under-19 football team, and debuted in the friendly match against Azerbaijan on 22 February 2014. She played in five matches of the 2014 Kuban Spring Tournament, three matches of the 2014 UEFA Championship Second qualifying round – Group 5, in two matches of the 2014 UEFA Development Tournament, in two games of the 2015 UEFA Championship First qualifying round – Group 4, in three matches of the 2015 UEFA Championship Elite round – Group 1, in three games of the 2015 UEFA Development Tournament, and in three matches of the 2016 UEFA Championship First qualifying round – Group 4. She capped 28 times and scored one goal for the national U-19 team.

Career statistics
.

Honours
 Turkish Women'sFirst League
 ALG Spor
 Runners-up (1): 2018–19

 Turkish Women's Second League
 Fomget Dençlik ve Spor
 Runners-up (1): 2013–14

 Amed S.K.
 Runners-up (1): 2016–17

 ALG Spor
 Winners (1): 2017–18

References

External links

Living people
1997 births
People from Siverek
Turkish women's footballers
Women's association football midfielders
Gazi Üniversitesispor players
Amed S.K. (women) players
ALG Spor players
Fomget Gençlik ve Spor players
Çaykur Rizespor (women's football) players